Stefan Markolf (born 3 January 1984) is the first deaf German professional footballer.

Career 
After joining the professional squad of 1. FSV Mainz 05 in 2007, where the defender was mostly substituted, he was signed by third division club Wuppertaler SV in 2008. After eight years he returned to KSV Hessen Kassel.

Personal 
Markolf was born deaf (about 90 percent hearing loss). Thanks to speech therapy, he has nearly perfect pronunciation of the spoken language. In spite of his hearing loss, he has a good overview in the football matches. He wears special hearing aids while playing.

References

External links 
  
 
 Stefan Markolf Interview

1984 births
Living people
People from Witzenhausen
Sportspeople from Kassel (region)
German footballers
Deaf association football players
1. FSV Mainz 05 players
1. FSV Mainz 05 II players
KSV Hessen Kassel players
Wuppertaler SV players
2. Bundesliga players
3. Liga players
German deaf people
Association football defenders
Footballers from Hesse